Dieter Großmann (born 1926), studied art at the Academy of Arts, Berlin/Germany at Professor Tank and Professor Speidel (Master Class) from 1948 - 1952. From 1974 to 1992 he taught painting the nude at the Academy of Adult Education Courses and at the Ulm University, Ulm, Germany. He was born in Frankfurt an der Oder.

Since 1970 he is a member of the Berufsverband Bildender Künstler (Association of Professional German Painters) and since 2000 he has chosen the computer as his medium. He is a digital artist worldwide.

He has won several awards and prizes working in traditional and digital media.

Awards and prizes (excerpt)

1966 Silver Medal for Graphic Design, Berlin/Germany
1973 Gold Medal for Graphic Design, Berlin/Germany
1976 Bronce Medal "Art in Medicine",   Cologne/Germany
1998 First prize for computer painting in Germany 1998, "Tetenal Creative Inkjet

External links 
2004 Feature in Kultura Extra
Grossmann's website 
Grossmann im museum of computer art MOCA
 Grossmann at www.kunstplattform.de 
Grossmann at Truly Virtual Web Art Museum 

1926 births
Possibly living people
German digital artists
People from Frankfurt (Oder)
Academic staff of the University of Ulm